Łączany may refer to the following places:
Łączany, Lesser Poland Voivodeship (south Poland)
Łączany, Masovian Voivodeship (east-central Poland)
Łączany, Opole Voivodeship (south-west Poland)